Nancy Steiner is an American costume designer.  Her credits include Little Miss Sunshine, Lost in Translation, The Lovely Bones, The Good Girl and The Virgin Suicides.

Her career started in the late 1980s styling bands for music videos and assisting on films and commercials. Some of the bands Nancy worked with include Stone Temple Pilots, Filter, R.E.M., The Rolling Stones, The Smashing Pumpkins, Red Hot Chili Peppers, Nirvana, Foo Fighters, No Doubt, Sheryl Crow, David Bowie, Air, Fat Boy Slim, Bjork, and R.E.M..]] . As time went on Nancy entered the world of film by designing Todd Haynes celebrated film "SAFE", then working with directors such as Sofia Coppola, Michel Gondry, Wim Wenders, Jonathan Dayton & Valerie Faris, Peter Jackson, and Miguel Arteta to name a few. Nancy also works in the commercial world with directors including Mark Romanek, Stacy Wall, Sebastian Strasser, Speck/Gordon and Dougal Wilson.

Awards

References

External links

American costume designers

Living people
Year of birth missing (living people)